Portopetro is a district of Santanyí on the island of Majorca, in the Balearic Islands of Spain, around 62 km from  Palma.

Portopetro is a small fishing village with a population of approximately 500 and consist of a harbour, small marina and a secluded beach  which is adjacent to the harbour. There are a number of restaurants and bars distributed along the harbour's edge serving local and Mediterranean cuisine.

Santanyí
Populated places in Mallorca
Beaches of Mallorca
Beaches of the Balearic Islands